Iglesia de San Miguel Arcángel (Trevías) is a church in Trevías, Valdés, Asturias, Spain. The church was established in 1000. In the portico, is a tombstone inscription in pink limestone which commemorates the completion of the early church on 21 March 1000

See also
Asturian art
Catholic Church in Spain
Churches in Asturias
List of oldest church buildings

References

Churches in Asturias
1000 establishments in Europe
10th-century churches in Spain
10th-century establishments in the Kingdom of León